In enzymology, a dolichyl-phosphate beta-glucosyltransferase is an enzyme that catalyzes the chemical reaction

UDP-glucose + dolichyl phosphate  UDP + dolichyl beta-D-glucosyl phosphate

Thus, the two substrates of this enzyme are UDP-glucose and dolichyl phosphate, whereas its two products are UDP and dolichyl beta-D-glucosyl phosphate.

This enzyme belongs to the family of glycosyltransferases, specifically the hexosyltransferases.  The systematic name of this enzyme class is UDP-glucose:dolichyl-phosphate beta-D-glucosyltransferase. Other names in common use include polyprenyl phosphate:UDP-D-glucose glucosyltransferase, UDP-glucose dolichyl-phosphate glucosyltransferase, uridine diphosphoglucose-dolichol glucosyltransferase, UDP-glucose:dolichol phosphate glucosyltransferase, UDP-glucose:dolicholphosphoryl glucosyltransferase, UDP-glucose:dolichyl monophosphate glucosyltransferase, and UDP-glucose:dolichyl phosphate glucosyltransferase.  This enzyme participates in n-glycan biosynthesis.

References

 
 
 

EC 2.4.1
Enzymes of unknown structure